Toy Story 4 is a 2019 American computer-animated comedy-drama film  produced by Pixar Animation Studios and released by Walt Disney Pictures. It is the fourth installment in the Toy Story franchise and the sequel to Toy Story 3 (2010). The film was directed by Josh Cooley (in his feature directorial debut) from the screenplay by Andrew Stanton and Stephany Folsom; they also conceived the story with John Lasseter, Rashida Jones, Will McCormack, Valerie LaPointe, and Martin Hynes. Toy Story 4 stars the voices of Tom Hanks, Tim Allen, Annie Potts, Tony Hale, Keegan-Michael Key, Jordan Peele, Madeleine McGraw, Christina Hendricks, Keanu Reeves, Ally Maki, Jay Hernandez, Lori Alan, and Joan Cusack. Set after the third film, Toy Story 4 follows Woody (Hanks) and Buzz Lightyear (Allen) as the pair and the other toys go on a road trip with Bonnie (McGraw), who creates Forky (Hale), a spork made with recycled materials from her school. Meanwhile, Woody is reunited with Bo Peep (Potts), and must decide where his loyalties lie.

Toy Story 4 premiered in Los Angeles on June 11, 2019, and was released in the United States on June 21. Made on a production budget of $200million, Toy Story 4 earned $1.073billion worldwide, finishing its theatrical run as the eighth-highest-grossing film of 2019. On the review aggregator website Rotten Tomatoes, the film holds an approval rating of  based on  reviews.

The film has received various awards and nominations. It won Best Animated Feature at the 25th Critics' Choice Awards. The film was nominated for six awards at the 47th Annie Awards. At the 92nd Academy Awards, it received two Oscar nominations, including Best Original Song (for "I Can't Let You Throw Yourself Away"), and won for Best Animated Feature. Various critic circles have also picked Toy Story 4 as the best animated feature film of the year.

Accolades

See also
 List of accolades received by Toy Story 3

Notes

References

External links
 

Lists of accolades by film
Pixar awards and nominations
Toy Story